"" is the debut single by Shiori Takei and released 18 February 2004 under Giza Studio label. The single reached #88 rank first week and sold 1,495 copies. It charted for 2 weeks and sold over 2,116 copies.

Track listing

In media
"Shizukanaru Melody": the song was used in Yomiuri TV program Pro Doumyaku as ending theme

Cover
The composer of Shizukanaru Melody, Aika Ohno self-cover this single in her cover album Silent Passage.

References

2004 singles
2004 songs
Being Inc. singles
Giza Studio singles
Songs written by Aika Ohno
Songs with lyrics by Nana Azuki